Tuff Chester David Harris (born January 23, 1983, in Crow Agency, Montana) is a former American football safety. He was signed by the Miami Dolphins as an undrafted free agent in 2007. He played college football at Montana.

Harris has also been a member of the New Orleans Saints, the Tennessee Titans and the Miami Dolphins.

Early years
Harris grew up in Lodge Grass, Montana, also known as the Valley of the Chiefs. He is a member of the Crow Nation. During his years at Lodge Grass High School, Harris played football, basketball, baseball, and ran track. His mother was an assistant coach for the track and field team. Harris's family moved to Colstrip after his sophomore year. After moving from Lodge Grass to Colstrip, Harris continued playing football, basketball, and track for the Colstrip Colts. In 2001, Tuff set an all-class Montana high school state record in the 100-meter dash.

College career
After graduating in 2002, Harris went to school at the University of Montana and was a four-year starter at cornerback for the Grizzlies and set school and BigSky records as a punt returner (including longest return, most return yards in one game, and most yards in a season).

Professional career

Miami Dolphins
After going undrafted in the 2007 NFL Draft, Harris was signed by the Miami Dolphins as an undrafted free agent on May 3. He was waived during final cuts on September 1 and re-signed to the team's practice squad, where he remained until being promoted to the active roster on November 14. He made his NFL debut in the regular season finale against the Cincinnati Bengals on December 30.

Harris was waived by the Dolphins the following offseason on April 24, 2008.

New Orleans Saints
The New Orleans Saints signed Harris on May 27, 2008. He was released by the team on July 30 due to ankle injuries.

Tennessee Titans
Harris was signed by the Tennessee Titans on August 19, 2008.  He was waived on August 29 and re-signed to the team's practice squad on September 1.  Harris was signed from the practice squad to the active roster on November 22 after cornerbacks Reynaldo Hill and Eric King were placed on injured reserve.

The Titans waived Harris on September 4, 2009.

Pittsburgh Steelers
Harris was signed to the Pittsburgh Steelers practice squad on September 7, 2009. He was signed to active roster on January 6, 2010.
Pittsburgh waived Harris on August 8, 2010.

Personal life
Tuff is married to Mary (Hasselberg) Harris. Mary is from Staples, Minnesota.  The two met while Mary was playing golf at the University of Montana and Tuff was on the football team.  Tuff is an enrolled member of the Apsaalooke Nation (Crow Tribe) and is also of Northern Cheyenne descent.

1983 births
Living people
American football cornerbacks
American football safeties
Edmonton Elks players
Miami Dolphins players
Montana Grizzlies football players
Native American sportspeople
New Orleans Saints players
People from Crow Agency, Montana
Pittsburgh Steelers players
Players of American football from Montana
Tennessee Titans players
People from Lodge Grass, Montana